En Vivo... El Hombre y su Música is an album by Ramón Ayala and his band Los Bravos del Norte, released on July 24, 2001, through the record label Freddie Records. In 2002, the album earned Ayala a Grammy Award for Best Mexican/Mexican-American Album.

Track listing
Introduction
La Vecina Me Puso el Dedo
Tragos Amargos
Chaparra de Mi Amor
Mi Golondrina
Mi Piquito de Oro
La Rama del Mesquite 		
Entierrenme Cantando
Gaviota
Solo una Patada
Rinconcito en el Cielo
Atras de la Raya
Donde Estas
Alma Gemela

Chart performance

References

2001 live albums
Ramón Ayala live albums
Spanish-language live albums
Grammy Award for Best Mexican/Mexican-American Album